Proceedings of the Institution of Electrical Engineers was a series journals which published the proceedings of the Institution of Electrical Engineers. It was originally established as the Journal of the Society of Telegraph Engineers in 1872, and was known under several titles over the years, such as Journal of the Institution of Electrical Engineers, Proceedings of the IEE and IEE Proceedings.

History

The journal was originally established in 1872, as
Journal of the Society of Telegraph Engineers (1872–1880)
Then underwent a series of name changes
Journal of the Society of Telegraph Engineers and of Electricians (1881–1882)
Journal of the Society of Telegraph-Engineers and Electricians (1883–1888)
Until in 1889 it settled into
Journal of the Institution of Electrical Engineers (1889–1940)
The journal remained under that name for over 50 years. 

From 1926 to 1940, a new journal was started
 Institution of Electrical Engineers - Proceedings of the Wireless Section of the Institution (1926–1940)

In 1941, the journals were reorganized in distinct parts. From 1941 to 1948 those were
Journal of the Institution of Electrical Engineers - Part I: General
Journal of the Institution of Electrical Engineers - Part II: Power Engineering
Journal of the Institution of Electrical Engineers - Part IIA: Automatic Regulators and Servo Mechanisms
Journal of the Institution of Electrical Engineers - Part III: Communication Engineering
Journal of the Institution of Electrical Engineers - Part III: Radio and Communication Engineering
Journal of the Institution of Electrical Engineers - Part IIIA: Radiocommunication
Journal of the Institution of Electrical Engineers - Part IIIA: Radiolocation

In 1949, until 1954, the publications were reorganized into
Journal of the Institution of Electrical Engineers 
and
Proceedings of the IEE - Part I: General
Proceedings of the IEE - Part IA: Electric Railway Traction
Proceedings of the IEE - Part II: Power Engineering
Proceedings of the IEE - Part IIA: Insulating Materials
Proceedings of the IEE - Part III: Radio and Communication Engineering
Proceedings of the IEE - Part IIIA: Television
Proceedings of the IEE - Part IV: Institution Monographs

Which in 1955 were renamed
Journal of the IEE (1955–1963)
and
Proceedings of the IEE - Part A: Power Engineering
Proceedings of the IEE - Part B: Electronic and Communication Engineering
Proceedings of the IEE - Part B: Radio and Electronic Engineering
Proceedings of the IEE - Part C: Monographs

These merged into a single journal in 1963, which remained until 1979. 
Proceedings of the Institution of Electrical Engineers (1963–1979)

In 1964, Journal of the IEE became
Electronics & Power (1964–1987)
which in 1988 became
IEE Review (1988–2006)

The proceedings were renamed in 1980 as IEE Proceedings. From 1980 until 1993, the IEE Proceedings had lettered parts
IEE Proceedings A (Physical Science, Measurement and Instrumentation, Management and Education)
IEE Proceedings A (Physical Science, Measurement and Instrumentation, Management and Education, Reviews)
IEE Proceedings A (Science, Measurement and Technology)
IEE Proceedings B (Electric Power Applications)
IEE Proceedings C (Generation, Transmission and Distribution)
IEE Proceedings D (Control Theory and Applications)
IEE Proceedings E (Computers and Digital Techniques)
IEE Proceedings F (Communications, Radar and Signal Processing)
IEE Proceedings F (Radar and Signal Processing)
IEE Proceedings G (Circuits, Devices and Systems)
IEE Proceedings G (Electronic Circuits and Systems)
IEE Proceedings H (Microwaves, Antennas and Propagation)
IEE Proceedings H (Microwaves, Optics and Antennas)
IEE Proceedings I (Communications, Speech and Vision)
IEE Proceedings I (Solid-State and Electron Devices)
IEE Proceedings J (Optoelectronics)
and were reorganized in 1994 until 2006
IEE Proceedings - Circuits, Devices and Systems
IEE Proceedings - Communications
IEE Proceedings - Computers and Digital Techniques
IEE Proceedings - Control Theory and Applications
IEE Proceedings - Electric Power Applications
IEE Proceedings - Generation, Transmission and Distribution
IEE Proceedings - Information Security
IEE Proceedings - Intelligent Transport Systems
IEE Proceedings - Microwaves, Antennas and Propagation
IEE Proceedings - Nanobiotechnology
IEE Proceedings - Optoelectronics
IEE Proceedings - Radar, Sonar and Navigation
IEE Proceedings - Science, Measurement and Technology
IEE Proceedings - Software
IEE Proceedings - Systems Biology
IEE Proceedings - Vision, Image and Signal Processing

After 2006, the IEE merged with the Institution of Incorporated Engineers (IIE) to form the Institution of Engineering and Technology (IET), and its journals were reorganized into various IET publications.

External links

Institution of Engineering and Technology academic journals
Engineering journals